was a  of the Imperial Japanese Navy.

Design and description
The Yūgumo class was a repeat of the preceding  with minor improvements that increased their anti-aircraft capabilities. Their crew numbered 228 officers and enlisted men. The ships had two Kampon geared steam turbines, each driving one propeller shaft, using steam provided by three Kampon water-tube boilers.

The main armament of the Yūgumo class consisted of six Type 3  guns in three twin-gun turrets, one superfiring pair aft and one turret forward of the superstructure. The guns were able to elevate up to 75° to increase their ability against aircraft, but their slow rate of fire, slow traversing speed, and the lack of any sort of high-angle fire-control system meant that they were virtually useless as anti-aircraft guns. They were built with four Type 96  anti-aircraft guns in two twin-gun mounts, but more of these guns were added over the course of the war. The ships were also armed with eight  torpedo tubes in a two quadruple traversing mounts; one reload was carried for each tube. Their anti-submarine weapons comprised two depth charge throwers for which 36 depth charges were carried.

Construction and career
Hamanami participated in the battles of the Philippine Sea, Leyte Gulf and Samar. She was assigned to 1st Diversion Task Force. On 26 October the destroyer assisted in the sinking of the cruiser .

On 11 November 1944, Hamanami was escorting troop convoy TA No. 3 from Manila, Philippines to Ormoc. She was sunk by aircraft of Task Force 38 in Ormoc Bay, west of Leyte, with 63 killed and 42 injured. The destroyer  rescued 167 survivors, including ComDesDiv 32 (Captain Oshima Ichitaro) and Commander Motokura.

Wreck
She was positively identified as a Yūgumo-class destroyer with her configuration of 127 mm guns and torpedo launchers. From the action reports by the US planes that sank her, Hamanamis bow was blown off before sinking. At the bottom, her whole bow section was missing.

Notes

References

External links
 CombinedFleet.com: Yūgumo-class destroyers
 CombinedFleet.com: Hamanami history

Yūgumo-class destroyers
World War II destroyers of Japan
Destroyers sunk by aircraft
Shipwrecks in the Philippine Sea
1943 ships
Maritime incidents in November 1944
Ships sunk by US aircraft
Shipwreck discoveries by Paul Allen
2018 archaeological discoveries
Ships built by Maizuru Naval Arsenal